Cochylis maiana,  Kearfott's rolandylis moth, is a moth of the  family Tortricidae. It is found in eastern North America, from Nova Scotia south to New Hampshire, Pennsylvania and New Jersey and North Carolina, but has also been recorded from southern France.

The length of the forewings is 3.3-4.6 mm. The ground color of the forewings is cream with a pale fuscous basal band with scattered pale tawny scales. The median band is fuscous with mostly tawny scales covering the discal cell. The subapical band is black, extending from the costa to the tornus and expanded medially toward the apex. It is scattered with tawny scales. The apex is tawny with some fuscous scales and the fringe is mixed tawny and fuscous. The underside is pale fuscous and the fringe concolorous. The hindwings are entirely pale fuscous. The underside is white with scattered pale brown marks from the middle to the termen.

References

External links
Bug Guide
mothphotographersgroup
Fauna Europaea

Cochylis
Moths of Europe
Moths described in 1907